Mélancolie may refer to:
"Melancolie", a Soviet-Moldovan song
"Melancolie", a song by Peppino di Capri
"Mélancolie", a song by Yves Duteil
"Mélancolie", a 2014 song by Soprano (rapper)